The Ayres LM200 Loadmaster was a small cargo aircraft developed in the 1990s by Ayres Corporation largely for the needs of small-package carriers. In 1996, urged on by Federal Express, development was begun, designed to carry four demi containers.  The aircraft was to be powered by a LHTEC CTP800-4T turboprop, which was composed of two CTP800s driving a single five-bladed Hamilton-Standard propeller through a combining gearbox.  To support this development effort, Ayres acquired the LET aircraft manufacturing company in the Czech Republic in September 1998. In 2001, the company was forced into bankruptcy when creditors foreclosed on it, and the Loadmaster program was terminated.

Specifications (LM200, as designed)

See also

References
Notes

Bibliography

External links
 Flug-revue LM 200 page 
 Forecast International Archive - Ayres Loadmaster 200 (a Microsoft Word document)

LM200
Abandoned civil aircraft projects of the United States
United States cargo aircraft
1990s United States civil aircraft
Single-engined turboprop aircraft
Single-engined tractor aircraft
High-wing aircraft